Syarhey Mikhailavich Balanovich (born 29 August 1987) is a Belarusian professional footballer. He plays as a left winger for Rogachev.

International
Balanovich made his debut for the senior national team of his country on 7 June 2012, in the 1–1 draw with Lithuania in a friendly match. He scored his first goal on 14 November 2012 in a 2–1 home win friendly against Israel.

Career statistics

Club

Notes

International
.

International goals
Scores and results list Belarus' goal tally first.

Honours
Shakhtyor Soligorsk
Belarusian Premier League champion: 2020
Belarusian Cup winner: 2013–14, 2018–19

References

External links
 
 

1987 births
Living people
Sportspeople from Pinsk
Belarusian footballers
Association football midfielders
Belarus under-21 international footballers
Belarus international footballers
Belarusian expatriate footballers
Expatriate footballers in Russia
Russian Premier League players
Russian First League players
FC Volna Pinsk players
FC Shakhtyor Soligorsk players
FC Amkar Perm players
FC Akron Tolyatti players
FC Slutsk players
FC Dnepr Rogachev players